John Robertson (April 13, 1787 – July 5, 1873) was a nineteenth-century politician and lawyer from the U.S. state of Virginia. He was the brother of Thomas B. Robertson and Wyndham Robertson.

Biography
Born at "Bellefield" near Petersburg, Virginia, Robertson completed preparatory studies and graduated from the College of William and Mary. He studied law and was admitted to the bar, commencing practice in Richmond, Virginia. He served as Attorney General of Virginia before being elected an Anti-Jacksonian and Whig to the United States House of Representatives to fill a vacancy, serving from 1834 to 1839. Afterwards, Robertson served as judge of the circuit court of chancery for Henrico County, Virginia for several years and was a delegate to the peace convention in Washington, D.C. in 1861. He was a member of the Virginia State Senate from 1861 to 1863 before his death at "Mount Athos" near Lynchburg, Virginia on July 5, 1873. He was interred in a private cemetery on the property.

References

1787 births
1873 deaths
Virginia state senators
Virginia lawyers
Virginia Attorneys General
College of William & Mary alumni
People of Virginia in the American Civil War
Virginia Whigs
National Republican Party members of the United States House of Representatives from Virginia
Whig Party members of the United States House of Representatives
19th-century American politicians
Robertson family of Virginia